Hypocrites, also known as The Hypocrites and The Naked Truth, is a 1915 silent drama film written and directed by Lois Weber (1879–1939). The film contains several full nude scenes, and is said to include the first appearance of full frontal nudity in a non-pornographic film by an American actress (Margaret Edwards). The film is regarded as anticlerical, and the nudity was justified by its religious context.

Cast

 Courtenay Foote as Gabriel, the Ascetic / Gabriel, a minister
 Herbert Standing as The Abbot / A pillar of the church
 Margaret Edwards as Truth
 Myrtle Stedman as a nun / A choir singer
 Adele Farrington as The Queen / An aristocrat
 Dixie Carr as a Magdalen
 Nigel De Brulier as a member of the choir / monk
 Matty Roubert as Boy kneeling beside cradle
 Charles Villiers as the Minister
 Vera Lewis as Parishioner (uncredited)

Cast notes:
 Margaret Edwards was 17 years old when she was discovered by Lois Weber.

Production
Writer-director Lois Weber attributed Adolphe Faugeron's painting La Vérité, or The Truth as the inspiration for the film.  During shooting, production had to be moved three times, due to the lack of a permanent studio.

Edwards' scenes, in which she appeared nude, were shot on a closed set, with only Weber, who directed the scenes, Edwards and a cameraman.

Dal Clawson devised special photographic techniques for the film, which was shot by George W. Hill. Sometimes six exposures were involved. The use in the film of traveling double exposure sequences of the woman is considered impressive for 1915.

It is thought that Weber may have re-edited the film after early review were published, before its official opening on January 20, 1915 at the Longacre Theater in New York City.

Reception
The film was passed by the British Board of Film Censors. However, because of the full and recurring nudity through the film, it caused riots in New York City, was banned in Ohio, and was subject to censorship in Boston when the mayor demanded that the film negatives be painted over to clothe the woman.

The film was re-issued in 1916.

Most of the film has survived, though some scenes have suffered from some serious nitrate decomposition in places especially at the beginning and cannot be restored. A print of the film is kept in the Library of Congress.

Further viewing

Further reading

References

External links

1910s avant-garde and experimental films
1915 drama films
1915 films
American black-and-white films
Silent American drama films
American silent feature films
Films directed by Lois Weber
American avant-garde and experimental films
Nudity in film
1910s American films